Funf is a compilation of B-sides from the band Clinic's first ten years, released in 2007.

Track listing
 "The Majestic" – 2:01
 "Nicht" – 1:32
 "Christmas" – 3:15
 "The Castle" – 2:50
 "You Can't Hurt You Anymore" – 2:07
 "Dissolution: The Dream of Bartholomew" – 2:40
 "Magic Boots" – 1:45
 "The Scythe" – 2:14
 "Lee Shan" – 3:16
 "J.O./Love Is Just a Tool" – 2:55
 "Circle I" – 1:34
 "Golden Rectangle" – 3:08

Personnel

Ade Blackburn – keyboard, melodica, lead vocals
Brian Campbell – bass, flute, backing vocals
Hartley – lead guitar, clarinet, keyboards
Carl Turney – drums, piano, backing vocals, additional percussion

External links
Angryape Funf update
Domino Records Funf

Clinic (band) compilation albums
B-side compilation albums
2007 compilation albums
Domino Recording Company compilation albums